Best of the J. Geils Band is a compilation album by American rock band The J. Geils Band, released in 2006.

Track listing
"Centerfold" (Seth Justman) – 3:35
"Freeze-Frame" (Peter Wolf, Justman) – 3:56
"Come Back" [single edit] (Wolf, Justman) – 3:34
"Love Stinks" (Wolf, Justman) – 3:46
"Sanctuary" (Wolf, Justman) – 3:53
"Give It to Me" [single edit] (Wolf, Justman) – 3:09
"Whammer Jammer" (live 1972) (Juke Joint Jimmy) – 2:46
"Looking for a Love (live 1972)" (Alexander, Samuels) – 5:04
"Must of Got Lost" (live 1975) (Wolf, Justman) – 6:35
"(Ain't Nothin' But a) Houseparty" (live '75) (Sharh, Thomas) – 5:01
"One Last Kiss" (Wolf, Justman) – 4:23
"Teresa" (Wolf, Justman) – 3:53
"Angel in Blue" (Justman) – 4:50
"Flamethrower" (Justman) – 4:59
"Night Time" (Justman) – 4:30
"Just Can't Wait" (live 1982) (Wolf, Justman) – 3:28
"I Do" (live 1982) (Paden, Paden, Smith, Stephenson, Mason) – 3:13
"Piss on the Wall" (Wolf, Justman) – 3:02

Personnel

J. Geils Band
 J. Geils – guitar
 Seth Justman – keyboard, vocals
 Peter Wolf – vocals
 Magic Dick – harmonica, trumpet
 Stephen Jo Bladd – percussion, drums, vocals
 Danny Klein – bass

Production
 Kevin Flaherty – producer, compilation producer
 Susan Lavoie – art direction
 Annie Leibovitz – front cover photography

References

The J. Geils Band albums
2006 greatest hits albums
Capitol Records compilation albums
Albums produced by Seth Justman